János Grimm (born 17 October 1895, date of death unknown) was a Hungarian cyclist. He competed in two events at the 1924 Summer Olympics.

References

External links
 

1895 births
Year of death missing
Hungarian male cyclists
Olympic cyclists of Hungary
Cyclists at the 1924 Summer Olympics
Cyclists from Budapest